Khumbize Kandodo Chiponda is a Malawian politician. In 2020 she became Minister of Health in Malawi.

Early life
Khumbize Chiponda is the sister of Ken Kandodo, also a politician, and related to Malawi's founding president, Hastings Banda. Before entering politics she trained as a pharmacist, and worked in the Ministry of Health as a biochemist.

Career as MP
In the 2014 general election Chiponda was elected a Malawi Congress Party (MCP) Member of Parliament for the Kasungu South East constituency. In December 2017 Chiponda pressed the Minister of Gender, Children, Disability and Social Welfare, Jean Kalilani, to explain what the private sector was doing to promote early childhood development activities in Malawi. In February 2018 she joined fellow MP Chimwendo Banda in defending the MCP against accusations of atrocities, and attacking "bad ministers" who had stained the MCP image but had subsequently joined the Democratic Progressive Party (DPP). In June 2018 she was announced as Organizing Secretary for the National Executive Committee of the MCP.

She kept her seat in the 2019 general election, and after the election was appointed as Deputy Chief Whip for the MCP. In February 2020 the Malawi Electoral Commission (MEC) commissioner Linda Kunje defended MEC process to a Parliamentary committee inquiring into irregularities which nullified the May 2019 Presidential elections. When Kunje justified "the same forms you are questioning, the incompetence you are talking of" as what had given MPs their positions, Chiponda accused Kunje of undermining the committee and walked out.

Minister of Health
In July 2020 President Lazarus Chakwera appointed Chiponda to the Cabinet of Malawi as Minister of Health. Her appointment prompted some accusations of favouritism and nepotism. Chakwera also picked Chiponda to co-chair a Presidential Taskforce on Coronavirus, together with Dr. John Phuka, a College of Medicine lecturer. She secured Germany's ongoing commitment to help the Malawi health sector amid the pandemic. On 27 July 2020 Chiponda issued a directive to health officials in Karonga to test anyone suspected of COVID-19 symptoms at Songwe Border.

References

Members of the National Assembly (Malawi)
Health ministers of Malawi
Women government ministers of Malawi
Year of birth missing (living people)
Living people